Phineas Lyman Tracy (December 25, 1786 – December 22, 1876) was a U.S. Representative from New York, brother of Albert Haller Tracy.

Born in Norwich, Connecticut, Tracy graduated from Yale College in 1806.
He engaged in teaching for two years.
He studied law.
He was admitted to the bar in 1811 and commenced practice in the village of Madison, New York.
He moved to Batavia, Genesee County, about 1815 and continued the practice of law.

Tracy was elected to the Twentieth Congress to fill the vacancy caused by the resignation of David E. Evans.
He was reelected as an Anti-Masonic candidate to the Twenty-first and Twenty-second Congresses and served from November 5, 1827, to March 3, 1833.

He was a presidential elector on the Whig ticket in 1840, voting for William Henry Harrison and John Tyler.

He was appointed presiding judge of Genesee County Court in 1841, and continued in that office until 1846, when he retired from public life.
He died in Batavia, New York, December 22, 1876.
He was interred in Batavia Cemetery.

See also
Fellows v. Blacksmith

References

1786 births
1876 deaths
Politicians from Norwich, Connecticut
Anti-Masonic Party members of the United States House of Representatives from New York (state)
New York (state) National Republicans
National Republican Party members of the United States House of Representatives
New York (state) Whigs
1840 United States presidential electors
People from Genesee County, New York
Yale College alumni
19th-century American politicians